The Ulysses S. Grant School is an historic high school, the home of the School Without Walls (Washington, D.C.)
It is located at 2130 G Street Northwest, Washington, D.C., in the Foggy Bottom neighborhood.

History
The Late Victorian building was designed by John B. Brady in 1882, and is listed on the National Register of Historic Places. On February 13, 2006 the D.C. City Council and the George Washington University Board of Trustees approved a deal for $12 million to renovate and expand the school building, in exchange for transfer of the school's rear parking lot property to the university.

References

School buildings completed in 1882
Victorian architecture in Washington, D.C.
School buildings on the National Register of Historic Places in Washington, D.C.